Latham Island, known locally as Fungu Kizimkazi, Fungu Mbaraka is a small, relatively isolated island in the Zanzibar Archipelago, Tanzania which is historically under the Government of Zanzibar since 1898.

History
The island has several local names in addition to Fungu Kizimkazi, the most notable of which are Fungu la Mbarak, after the Arab who had the right to collect wreckage there in the reign of Seyid Barghash who was the Sultan of Zanzibar; Shungu Mbili and Shan Jove. The island was featured on an early sixteenth century Portuguese map (Ingrams, n.d) but it derives its present name from the East India  man Latham, who rediscovered it in 1758.

Zanzibar Administration on the Island
The island was annexed to Zanzibar on 19 October 1898 when British First Minister Sir Lloyd Mathews under the order of the Sultan of Zanzibar visited the island, planted the Zanzibar Flag, and declared it to be under the administration of Zanzibar. Lloyd Mathews arrived on the island on 18 October 1898 with the warship HHS Barawa alongside Captain Arthur Agnew, Zanzibar Port Officer, and Dr. Alfred Andrew Spurrier, a Medical Officer.

Following the Plantation of Zanzibar Flag on 19 October 1898, 21-gun salutes were performed as a military honor and the island was officially annexed to the Sultan's authority. An iron house  was built; its corner stone was laid and written with "LATHAM ISLAND, FUNGU KIZIMKAZI UNDER ZANZIBAR SOVEREIGNTY".

Geography
The island is surrounded by a fringing reef and is oceanic, as it lies off the continental shelf and is surrounded by deep water.

Ecology
The island is an important breeding ground for various bird species, namely the masked booby, greater crested tern, sooty tern and the brown noddy, and has been designated an Important Bird Area by BirdLife International. Latham is also thought to be of importance for nesting turtles.

Dispute
Although the Island is under Zanzibar territorial water, controversy has emerged over the ownership of the Latham Island between Zanzibar and Tanzania Mainland, the Island is ruled by the United Republic of Tanzania and not under the Zanzibar jurisdiction. Some members of the House of Representatives in Zanzibar and Opposition leaders have been complaining about ownership of the Blocks and Latham Island.

References

Uninhabited islands of Tanzania
Islands of Zanzibar
Zanzibar Archipelago
Important Bird Areas of the Zanzibar Archipelago